Canindea signaticornis is a species of beetle in the family Cerambycidae. It was described by Buquet in 1857. It is known from Brazil and French Guiana.

References

Calliini
Beetles described in 1857
Beetles of South America